The Theodore von Kármán Prize in applied mathematics is awarded every fifth year to an individual in recognition of his or her notable application of mathematics to mechanics and/or the engineering sciences. This award was established and endowed in 1968 in honor of Theodore von Kármán by the Society for Industrial and Applied Mathematics (SIAM).

List of recipients
1972 Geoffrey Ingram Taylor
1979 George F. Carrier and Joseph B. Keller
1984 Julian D. Cole
1989 Paul R. Garabedian
1994 Herbert B. Keller
1999 Stuart S. Antman, John M. Ball and Simone Zuccher
2004 Roland Glowinski
2009 Mary F. Wheeler
2014 Weinan E and Richard D. James
2020 Kaushik Bhattacharya

See also
 List of mathematics awards

References

Awards established in 1968
Awards of the Society for Industrial and Applied Mathematics
1968 establishments in the United States